The Doof Shed is a small, portable nightclub created by twins Harry Nathan and Evangelos "Boonie" Labrakis. It holds a Guinness World Record for being the smallest nightclub in the world, measuring 1.53m x 0.74m x 1.88m and beating out previous record holder, Club 28 in Rotherham, England.

History and description
The Doof Shed, measuring 1.53m x 0.74m x 1.88m, was built and furnished in Sydney, Australia from a repurposed corrugated metal shed with the help of the twins' father to fill a need after the COVID-19 pandemic in Australia upended Sydney's nightclub scene. The exterior graffiti-style logo was applied in bright neon paint while the interior contains hallmarks typical of a nightclub, including a fog machine, smart lighting, a disco ball and a Pioneer DJ setup. The capacity of the nightclub is just 7 people, potential patrons must enter a ballot on DoofShed.com.

References

Nightclubs in Sydney
Guinness World Records